Heteroflorum is a genus of flowering plants in the family Fabaceae. It is found in the Mexican states of Michoacán, Guerrero, and Oaxaca. It belongs to the subfamily Caesalpinioideae.

References 

Caesalpinioideae
Fabaceae genera
Monotypic Fabaceae genera